The Saint Nicholas Church is a ruined medieval church at the village of  in Abkhazia, an entity in the South Caucasus with a disputed political status. It is located some 18 km northwest of the town of Gudauta, at the foot of the Bzyb Range.

History 
The extant structure is a remnant of a hall church, probably built in the period of the 10th-12th century and covered by dense foliage. No contemporary historical records mention it. In 1967, while exploring the ruins, the art historian Leo Shervashidze found a limestone slab carrying a partially damaged Georgian inscription in the medieval asomtavruli script arranged in 14 lines around a Maltese-type cross carved in relief. The extant text relates that the church was constructed in the reign of King George around the time when Gurandukht was born, imploring St. Nicholas's intercession before the Christ. Based on the context and epigraphic features of the inscription, this king George is variously identified as George II of Abkhazia by Leo Shervashidze, George I of Georgia by Teimuraz Barnaveli, or George III of Georgia by Vladimir Silogava and Andrey Vinogradov and Denis Beletsky. All these monarchs had a daughter named Gurandukht.

References 

Georgian Orthodox churches in Georgia (country)
Churches in Abkhazia